The Roaring River is a  river in Barry County, Missouri, in the Ozarks.  It is a tributary of the White River, into which it flows in Eagle Rock, Missouri.  This section of the White River is a reservoir called Table Rock Lake.

The stream was named on account of roaring waters from a cave along its course.

See also
List of rivers of Missouri
List of rivers of Arkansas
List of Ozark springs

References

Rivers of Missouri
Tributaries of the White River (Arkansas–Missouri)
Rivers of Barry County, Missouri